SilverDoor Apartments is an independent serviced apartment agent headquartered in Chiswick, London, UK, with further offices in Lancaster, Madrid, Singapore, Denver and Hyderabad. The company specializes in the provision of serviced apartments worldwide and is used by corporate and private clients for relocation, staff housing programmes, business visits, international assignments, city breaks and conferences.

Operations 
SilverDoor represents over 320,000 serviced apartments in more than 1,200 cities around the globe. The company works with over 1,600 property partners by marketing their serviced apartments on their website, financed by commission.

In October 2010 the company joined the Hotel Booking Agents Association, a trade body which brings together serviced apartment buyers and suppliers to develop and promote best practice.

From 2008, SilverDoor ran a £150 Attendance Bonus scheme, a monthly supplement encouraging employees to be no more than a minute late to work, despite any legitimate public transport constraints. With its workforce comprised predominantly of new graduates on minimal salaries, the scheme proved a helpful stipend for those that qualified.  

In March 2016, SilverDoor achieved the Association of Serviced Apartment Providers' newly launched Agent Quality Accreditation. 

In May 2016, SilverDoor acquired Citybase Apartments.

November 2016 saw the company open its first international office in Singapore.

In December 2017 SilverDoor formed part of the parent company, Habicus Group, together with its sister brands Citybase Apartments, Central London Apartments and Orbital Partnerships.

In May 2018 SilverDoor launched its online booking platform, Orbi.

In January 2019 SilverDoor opened its Americas headquarters in Denver.

In September 2021 SilverDoor's parent company acquired rival serviced apartment agent The Apartment Service. In April 2022 The Apartment Service was merged with SilverDoor. 

In April 2022 SilverDoor opened its Iberia and LATAM headquarters in Madrid.

Awards 

SilverDoor was named in The Sunday Times 100 Best Small Companies to Work For in 2012, 2013 and 2015.

The serviced apartment provider won the Best Property Provider Solution at the Relocate Global Awards 2012/13.
 
In 2015 SilverDoor won Corporate Housing Provider of the Year at the Expatriate Management and Mobility Awards and the Association of Serviced Apartment Providers Award for Innovation.

SilverDoor was named Best Serviced Apartment Provider at the Business Travel Awards 2016.

In 2018 SilverDoor won Corporate Housing Provider of the Year at the APAC Expatriate Management and Mobility Awards. In the same year SilverDoor also won Corporate Housing Provider of the Year at the EMEA Expatriate Management and Mobility Awards.

SilverDoor was again named the Corporate Housing Provider of the Year at the 2019 EMEA Expatriate Management and Mobility Awards.

In 2020 SilverDoor won the Best Agent award at the Serviced Apartment Awards.

In 2021 SilverDoor received a CHPA Tower of Excellence Award for Most Creative Marketing.

In May 2022 SilverDoor won the Outstanding Achievement Award at the Serviced Apartment Awards.

References 

Companies based in the London Borough of Hounslow